Time for Mercy is the debut album by Canadian singer-songwriter Jann Arden, released in 1993. The album’s second single was "I Would Die for You", which received national radio and video airplay. Its video, directed by Jeth Weinrich, won the Juno Award for Video of the Year at the 1994 Juno Awards.

Track listing
All tracks composed by Jann Arden; except where indicated
"I Would Die for You" – 4:36
"Waiting for Someone" (Arden, Russell Broom) – 4:40
"Will You Remember Me" – 3:46
"We Do Some Strange Things" – 5:31
"I'm Not Your Lover" – 4:13
"Give Me Back My Heart" – 5:02
"The Way Things Are Going" – 4:10
"Kitchen Window" – 5:06
"I Just Don't Love You Anymore" – 3:53
"Time for Mercy" – 4:15
"Over You" – 5:31

Personnel
Jann Arden – acoustic guitar, vocals
David Campbell – conductor
Lenny Castro – percussion
Ed Cherney – background vocals
Bob Foster – guitar, electric guitar, background vocals
Dominic Genova – bass guitar
Mark Goodman – piano
Jim Keltner – cymbals, drums, stick
Iki Levy – percussion
Kenny Lyon – bass
Sid Page – violin
Mickey Raphael – harmonica
David Resnik – electric guitar, Leslie guitar
Johnny Lee Schell – electric guitar, harmony vocals
Tom Tally – viola
Kevan Torfeh – cello
Jeffrey C.J. Vanston – synthesizer, guitar, piano, pedal steel, electric guitar, horn, Hammond organ

Production
Producer: Ed Cherney
Executive producer: Neil MacGonigill
Engineers: Ed Cherney, Paul Dieter, Bob Salcedo, Duane Seykora, Scott "T-Bone" Stillman
Assistant engineers: Paul Dieter, Bob Salcedo, Brett Swain
Mixing: Ed Cherney, Brett Swain
Mastering: Ron Lewter, Doug Sax
String arrangements: David Campbell
Piano technician: Edd Kolakowski
Guitar technician: Edd Kolakowski
Special production assistance: Edd Kolakowski
Art direction: Rowan Moore
Design: Rowan Moore
Photography: Michael Tighe, Jeth Weinrich

Jann Arden albums
1993 debut albums
Albums arranged by David Campbell (composer)
A&M Records albums